Parrondo's paradox, a paradox in game theory, has been described as: A combination of losing strategies becomes a winning strategy. It is named after its creator, Juan Parrondo, who discovered the paradox in 1996. A more explanatory description is:

There exist pairs of games, each with a higher probability of losing than winning, for which it is possible to construct a winning strategy by playing the games alternately.

Parrondo devised the paradox in connection with his analysis of the Brownian ratchet, a thought experiment about a machine that can purportedly extract energy from random heat motions popularized by physicist Richard Feynman.  However, the paradox disappears when rigorously analyzed. Winning strategies consisting of various combinations of losing strategies were explored in biology before Parrondo's paradox was published.

Illustrative examples

The saw-tooth example

Consider an example in which there are two points A and B having the same altitude, as shown in Figure 1. In the first case, we have a flat profile connecting them. Here, if we leave some round marbles in the middle that move back and forth in a random fashion, they will roll around randomly but towards both ends with an equal probability. Now consider the second case where we have a saw-tooth-like region between them. Here also, the marbles will roll towards either ends with equal probability (if there were a tendency to move in one direction, marbles in a ring of this shape would tend to spontaneously extract thermal energy to revolve, violating the second law of thermodynamics). Now if we tilt the whole profile towards the right, as shown in Figure 2, it is quite clear that both these cases will become biased towards B.

Now consider the game in which we alternate the two profiles while judiciously choosing the time between alternating from one profile to the other.

When we leave a few marbles on the first profile at point E, they distribute themselves on the plane showing preferential movements towards point B. However, if we apply the second profile when some of the marbles have crossed the point C, but none have crossed point D, we will end up having most marbles back at point E (where we started from initially) but some also in the valley towards point A given sufficient time for the marbles to roll to the valley. Then we again apply the first profile and repeat the steps (points C, D and E now shifted one step to refer to the final valley closest to A). If no marbles cross point C before the first marble crosses point D, we must apply the second profile shortly before the first marble crosses point D, to start over.

It easily follows that eventually we will have marbles at point A, but none at point B. Hence if we define having marbles at point A as a win and having marbles at point B as a loss, we clearly win by alternating (at correctly chosen times) between playing two losing games.

The coin-tossing example
A second example of Parrondo's paradox is drawn from the field of gambling. Consider playing two games, Game A and Game B with the following rules. For convenience, define  to be our capital at time t, immediately before we play a game.
 Winning a game earns us $1 and losing requires us to surrender $1. It follows that  if we win at step t and  if we lose at step t.
 In Game A, we toss a biased coin, Coin 1, with probability of winning . If , this is clearly a losing game in the long run.
 In Game B, we first determine if our capital is a multiple of some integer . If it is, we toss a biased coin, Coin 2, with probability of winning . If it is not, we toss another biased coin, Coin 3, with probability of winning . The role of modulo  provides the periodicity as in the ratchet teeth.

It is clear that by playing Game A, we will almost surely lose in the long run. Harmer and Abbott show via simulation that if  and  Game B is an almost surely losing game as well. In fact, Game B is a Markov chain, and an analysis of its state transition matrix (again with M=3) shows that the steady state probability of using coin 2 is 0.3836, and that of using coin 3 is 0.6164. As coin 2 is selected nearly 40% of the time, it has a disproportionate influence on the payoff from Game B, and results in it being a losing game.

However, when these two losing games are played in some alternating sequence - e.g. two games of A followed by two games of B (AABBAABB...), the combination of the two games is, paradoxically, a winning game. Not all alternating sequences of A and B result in winning games. For example, one game of A followed by one game of B (ABABAB...) is a losing game, while one game of A followed by two games of B (ABBABB...) is a winning game. This coin-tossing example has become the canonical illustration of Parrondo's paradox – two games, both losing when played individually, become a winning game when played in a particular alternating sequence.

Resolving the paradox 
The apparent paradox has been explained using a number of sophisticated approaches, including Markov chains, flashing ratchets, simulated annealing, and information theory. One way to explain the apparent paradox is as follows:

 While Game B is a losing game under the probability distribution that results for  modulo  when it is played individually ( modulo  is the remainder when  is divided by ), it can be a winning game under other distributions, as there is at least one state in which its expectation is positive.
 As the distribution of outcomes of Game B depend on the player's capital, the two games cannot be independent. If they were, playing them in any sequence would lose as well.

The role of  now comes into sharp focus. It serves solely to induce a dependence between Games A and B, so that a player is more likely to enter states in which Game B has a positive expectation, allowing it to overcome the losses from Game A. With this understanding, the paradox resolves itself: The individual games are losing only under a distribution that differs from that which is actually encountered when playing the compound game. In summary, Parrondo's paradox is an example of how dependence can wreak havoc with probabilistic computations made under a naive assumption of independence. A more detailed exposition of this point, along with several related examples, can be found in Philips and Feldman.

A simplified example
For a simpler example of how and why the paradox works, again consider two games Game A and Game B, this time with the following rules:
 In Game A, you simply lose $1 every time you play.
 In Game B, you count how much money you have left ⁠ ⁠—  if it is an even number you win $3, otherwise you lose $5.

Say you begin with $100 in your pocket. If you start playing Game A exclusively, you will obviously lose all your money in 100 rounds. Similarly, if you decide to play Game B exclusively, you will also lose all your money in 100 rounds.

However, consider playing the games alternatively, starting with Game B, followed by A, then by B, and so on (BABABA...). It should be easy to see that you will steadily earn a total of $2 for every two games.

Thus, even though each game is a losing proposition if played alone, because the results of Game B are affected by Game A, the sequence in which the games are played can affect how often Game B earns you money, and subsequently the result is different from the case where either game is played by itself.

Applications
Parrondo's paradox is used extensively in game theory, and its application to engineering, population dynamics, financial risk, etc., are areas of active research. Parrondo's games are of little practical use such as for investing in stock markets as the original games require the payoff from at least one of the interacting games to depend on the player's capital. However, the games need not be restricted to their original form and work continues in generalizing the phenomenon. Similarities to volatility pumping and the two envelopes problem have been pointed out. Simple finance textbook models of security returns have been used to prove that individual investments with negative median long-term returns may be easily combined into diversified portfolios with positive median long-term returns. Similarly, a model that is often used to illustrate optimal betting rules has been used to prove that splitting bets between multiple games can turn a negative median long-term return into a positive one. In evolutionary biology, both bacterial random phase variation and the evolution of less accurate sensors have been modelled and explained in terms of the paradox. In ecology, the periodic alternation of certain organisms between nomadic and colonial behaviors has been suggested as a manifestation of the paradox. There has been an interesting application in modelling multicellular survival as a consequence of the paradox and some interesting discussion on the feasibility of it. Applications of Parrondo's paradox can also be found in reliability theory.

Name
In the early literature on Parrondo's paradox, it was debated whether the word 'paradox' is an appropriate description given that the Parrondo effect can be understood in mathematical terms. The 'paradoxical' effect can be mathematically explained in terms of a convex linear combination.

However, Derek Abbott, a leading researcher on the topic, provides the following answer regarding the use of the word 'paradox' in this context:

See also 
Brazil nut effect
Brownian ratchet
Game theory
List of paradoxes
Ratchet effect
Statistical mechanics

References

Further reading
 John Allen Paulos, A Mathematician Plays the Stock Market, Basic Books, 2004, .
 Neil F. Johnson, Paul Jefferies, Pak Ming Hui, Financial Market Complexity, Oxford University Press, 2003, .
 Ning Zhong and Jiming Liu, Intelligent Agent Technology: Research and Development, World Scientific, 2001, .
 Elka Korutcheva and Rodolfo Cuerno, Advances in Condensed Matter and Statistical Physics, Nova Publishers, 2004, .
 Maria Carla Galavotti, Roberto Scazzieri, and Patrick Suppes, Reasoning, Rationality, and Probability, Center for the Study of Language and Information, 2008, .
 Derek Abbott and Laszlo B. Kish, Unsolved Problems of Noise and Fluctuations, American Institute of Physics, 2000, .
 Visarath In, Patrick Longhini, and Antonio Palacios, Applications of Nonlinear Dynamics: Model and Design of Complex Systems, Springer, 2009, .
 Marc Moore, Sorana Froda, and Christian Léger, Mathematical Statistics and Applications: Festschrift for Constance van Eeden, IMS, 2003, .
 Ehrhard Behrends, Fünf Minuten Mathematik: 100 Beiträge der Mathematik-Kolumne der Zeitung Die Welt, Vieweg+Teubner Verlag, 2006, .
 Lutz Schimansky-Geier, Noise in Complex Systems and Stochastic Dynamics, SPIE, 2003, .
 Susan Shannon, Artificial Intelligence and Computer Science, Nova Science Publishers, 2005, .
 Eric W. Weisstein, CRC Concise Encyclopedia of Mathematics, CRC Press, 2003, .
 David Reguera, José M. G. Vilar, and José-Miguel Rubí, Statistical Mechanics of Biocomplexity, Springer, 1999, .
 Sergey M. Bezrukov, Unsolved Problems of Noise and Fluctuations, Springer, 2003, .
 Julian Chela-Flores, Tobias C. Owen, and F. Raulin, First Steps in the Origin of Life in the Universe, Springer, 2001, .
 Tönu Puu and Iryna Sushko, Business Cycle Dynamics: Models and Tools, Springer, 2006, .
 Andrzej S. Nowak and Krzysztof Szajowski, Advances in Dynamic Games: Applications to Economics, Finance, Optimization, and Stochastic Control, Birkhäuser, 2005, .
 Cristel Chandre, Xavier Leoncini, and George M. Zaslavsky, Chaos, Complexity and Transport: Theory and Applications, World Scientific, 2008, .
 Richard A. Epstein, The Theory of Gambling and Statistical Logic (Second edition), Academic Press, 2009, .
 Clifford A. Pickover, The Math Book, Sterling, 2009, .

External links
 J. M. R. Parrondo, Parrondo's paradoxical games
  Google Scholar profiling of Parrondo's paradox
 Nature news article on Parrondo's paradox
 Alternate game play ratchets up winnings: It's the law
 Official Parrondo's paradox page
 Parrondo's Paradox - A Simulation
 The Wizard of Odds on Parrondo's Paradox
 Parrondo's Paradox at Futility Closet
 Parrondo's Paradox at Wolfram
  Online Parrondo simulator
 Parrondo's paradox at Maplesoft
 Donald Catlin on Parrondo's paradox
 Parrondo's paradox and poker
 Parrondo's paradox and epistemology
 A Parrondo's paradox resource
 Optimal adaptive strategies and Parrondo
 Behrends on Parrondo
 God doesn't shoot craps 
 Parrondo's paradox in chemistry
 Parrondo's paradox in genetics
 Parrondo effect in quantum mechanics
 Financial diversification and Parrondo

Mathematical paradoxes
Game theory
Decision-making paradoxes